Year 362 (CCCLXII) was a common year starting on Tuesday (link will display the full calendar) of the Julian calendar. At the time, it was known as the Year of the Consulship of Mamertinus and Nevitta (or, less frequently, year 1115 Ab urbe condita). The denomination 362 for this year has been used since the early medieval period, when the Anno Domini calendar era became the prevalent method in Europe for naming years.

Events 
 By place 
 Roman Empire 
 July 18 – Emperor Julian arrives at Antioch with an expeditionary force (60,000 men), and stays there for nine months, to launch a campaign against the Persian Empire. He secures the co-operation of King Arsaces of Armenia, who fights a bloody guerrilla war against the Persians.
 Julian builds  a fleet of 50 warships, and more than 1,000 transport boats at Samosata (Commagene), for his expedition in Persia against King Shapur II the Great. 
 An earthquake strikes Nicaea (Turkey).
 An earthquake strikes Al-Karak (Jordan).

 By topic 
 Religion 
 February 21 – Athanasius returns to Alexandria and convenes a council, at which he appeals for unity among Christians who differ in terminology, but Emperor Julian orders Athanasius to leave Alexandria. He will remain in exile in Upper Egypt, until after Julian's death the next year.
 October 22 – The temple of Apollo at Daphne, outside Antioch, is destroyed in a mysterious fire.

Births 
 Flavia Maxima Constantia, daughter of Constantius II (approximate date) 
 Mesrop Mashtots, Armenian linguist (d. 440)
 Jin Xiaowudi, emperor of the Eastern Jin Dynasty (d. 396)

Deaths 

 January 1 – Paulus Catena, Roman politician
 February 25 – Reginos, Greek Orthodox bishop and saint
 May 10 – Gordianus and Epimachus, Roman Catholic priests, martyrs and saints
 June 5 – Dorotheus of Tyre, Roman Catholic bishop and martyr (b. 255)
 June 27 – Crispus, Crispinianus, and Benedicta, Roman Catholic, priests, martyrs and saints
 June 28 – Basil of Ancyra, Byzantine Orthodox bishop and saint
 August 5 – Eusignius of Antioch, Byzantine Orthodox bishop and martyr (b. 252)
 August 7 – Donatus of Arezzo, Roman Catholic bishop and saint
 October 16 – Eliphius, Roman Catholic priest and saint
 October 20
 Artemius, Egyptian Orthodox martyr and saint
 Theodoret of Antioch, Syrian Christian priest and martyr
 December 10 – Gemellus of Ancyra, Byzantine Orthodox bishop and saint

Date unknown 
 Princess Dowager Ma, concubine of Zhang Jun

References